Trillium reliquum, the relict trillium, Confederate wakerobin, or Confederate trillium, is a monocotyledon species of the genus Trillium, a perennial, flowering, herbaceous plant of the family Liliaceae. It is found only in the southeastern region of the United States: southwest, central and east central Alabama, Georgia, South Carolina and  Tennessee. As a relict species, there are a few remaining groups but it was once more abundant when conditions were different. Significant habitat loss has occurred through clearing of forests for agricultural and pine farm uses.

On April 4, 1988, it was officially listed as an endangered species. The common name varies by location. It grows in undisturbed hardwood forests that sometimes include mature pines and that are free of understory plants such as bushes and vines. It likes moist, well-drained soils along the banks of streams and small stream floodplains, mixed with other wildflowers and forest debris.

Trillium reliquum was first collected near Augusta in 1901 but was not described as a new species until 1975. In February 2010, hikers found the plant at the Lake Jackson Mounds Archaeological State Park in the Florida Panhandle. The US Fish and Wildlife Service is surveying the plants. February 23rd 2021 a local mountain biker in Cordova Alabama found the endangered species for the first time ever documented in Walker County Alabama.

Description
Trillium reliquum has a sessile flower on a curved stem  at the center of its three mottled leaves that are blue-green, to green to silver in color. It flowers from March to April. From the end of a stocky underground rhizome, the plant sprouts a single shoot topped by the three mottled leaves and a single sessile flower; the flower is only half the size of the leaves. The stem is normally not erect, but rather lies along the ground. The flower consists of three petals, alternating with three sepals. The flowers can be greenish to brownish-purple and even pure yellow at times. Its three sepals spread out and usually are a purple color on the inside. The three petals tend to be erect and somewhat twisted, varying from dark purple to yellow in color. The petals are about twice as long as the stamens. The fruit, which is a round, fleshy capsule, appears  from May to June.

Future
The U.S. Fish & Wildlife Service lists this plant as surviving in 21 sites in Alabama, Georgia and South Carolina. The relict trillium has also been found in Tennessee and Florida. The reasons for the restrictions of this formerly widespread plant to only a few locations is not entirely clear. It is not commonly collected in the wild (for aesthetic or other uses) and is therefore considered relatively safe, in spite of its endangerment. There is no evidence that its numbers have declined recently.

References

External links
 
 
 
 
 Recovery plan for trillium reliquum U.S. Fish & Wildlife Service. (PDF) Retrieved November 16, 2009
 
 
 
 

reliquum
Endemic flora of the United States
Flora of the Southeastern United States
Flora of Georgia (U.S. state)
Endangered flora of the United States